Jesús Salvador Pérez Llerena (born December 25, 1971, in Córdoba, Bolívar) is a retired male boxer from Colombia, who competed in the bantamweight division (– 54 kg) during his career. He represented his native country at the 1992 Summer Olympics in Barcelona, Spain, where he was defeated in the first round of the men's bantamweight competition by France's Philippe Wartelle (5:12).

References
Profile

1971 births
Living people
Bantamweight boxers
Olympic boxers of Colombia
Boxers at the 1992 Summer Olympics
Colombian male boxers
20th-century Colombian people